The Rad Saline Center cis. 389 Z.C.B.J., also known as Saline Center Lodge Hall, is an historic building in rural Nebraska located about 9 miles north of Western, Nebraska that was built in 1939. It was listed on the National Register of Historic Places on January 4, 1996. It historically served as a meeting hall for the Czech community.

See also
 Zapadni Ceska Bratrska Jednota
 Czech-Slovak Protective Society

References

External links
 

Western Fraternal Life Association
Clubhouses on the National Register of Historic Places in Nebraska
Buildings and structures in Saline County, Nebraska
Czech-American culture in Nebraska
Buildings and structures completed in 1939
National Register of Historic Places in Saline County, Nebraska
1939 establishments in Nebraska